Manuel Basté (18 June 1899 – 4 December 1977) was a Spanish water polo player. He competed in the men's tournament at the 1924 Summer Olympics.

References

External links
 

1899 births
1977 deaths
Spanish male water polo players
Olympic water polo players of Spain
Water polo players at the 1924 Summer Olympics
Water polo players from Barcelona
20th-century Spanish people